Once More, My Darling is a 1949 American comedy film directed by and starring Robert Montgomery and Ann Blyth. The film was nominated for an Academy Award for Best Sound Recording (Leslie I. Carey).

Plot
Collier "Collie" Laing, a confirmed bachelor, still lives with his mother, a high-powered attorney. When he is unexpectedly called up by the United States Army Reserve with the rank of captain, Collier is given a peculiar assignment.

Superior officer Colonel Head, cooperating with law enforcement, tells Collier about a jewel heist and how one of the gems has been spotted in a perfume ad, worn by Marita "Killer" Connell, a young actress. There is suspicion that a jewel thief who loves Marita gave her this stolen item, not telling her where or how he got it.

Collier's odd assignment is to romance the young lady. Pretending to be a survey taker, he makes her acquaintance at a Beverly Hills hotel where Marita is immediately smitten. So much so that she insists on meeting his mother, crashing Mrs. Laing's party of distinguished guests in an altogether unsuitable outfit and offending them with the scent of her terrible perfume.

Marita manages to coax Collier into driving her to Las Vegas to get married. He tries to stall, then finally blurts out that he has no intention of marrying Marita when the jealous jewel thief bursts in on them. Collier must fight off him, then Marita's chauffeur, then even a passing truck driver.

A heartbroken and angry Marita wants nothing more to do with him, which is about the same time Collier realizes that he really has fallen in love with her.

Cast

References

External links
 

1949 films
1949 comedy films
American comedy films
American black-and-white films
Films directed by Robert Montgomery (actor)
Universal Pictures films
1940s English-language films
1940s American films